Dolnja Težka Voda is a settlement south of Novo Mesto in southeastern Slovenia. It lies on the main road from Novo Mesto to Metlika. The entire area is part of the traditional region of Lower Carniola and is now included in the Southeast Slovenia Statistical Region.

Name
The names Dolnja Težka Voda and neighboring Gornja Težka Voda literally mean 'lower' and 'upper heavy water/creek', respectively. The name is derived from the creek north of the settlements, known as Težka voda (Heavy Creek), and was later transferred to the villages. The settlements were first recorded in German written records as Swernwazzer in 1393 (and as Swernwasser in 1439, and vom Swarem wasser in 1477). The name refers to slowly flowing water; the elevation difference between the source of the 6 km creek and its outlet is only 7 m.

References

External links

Dolnja Težka Voda on Geopedia

Populated places in the City Municipality of Novo Mesto